Dunsandel is a small rural town in the Canterbury region of the South Island, New Zealand.  The town is located on the Canterbury Plains just south of the Selwyn River / Waikirikiri and about 40 km south of Christchurch.  Dunsandel is a junction town on SH1, halfway between Christchurch and Ashburton, with roads leading to Leeston, Southbridge and Hororata.  The town provides an important refreshment stop for main road travellers with eateries and coffee shops, as well as acting as a support town for the rural hinterland.

The town was established to serve the local farming community which includes dairy, sheep and cropping and continues providing veterinary, transport and vehicle repair services. It was named after Dunsandle Castle, the home of Robert Daly, who had owned the land on which the town as established. It has one primary school for approximately 150 children. The town is the home to the Dunsandel Cricket Club. The club's 'A' team has a reputation as one of the premier teams in the Ellesmere district.

Demographics
It is part of the Bankside statistical area.

Dunsandel had a population of 438 at the 2018 New Zealand census, a decrease of 3 people (-0.7%) since the 2013 census, and an increase of 39 people (9.8%) since the 2006 census. There were 156 households. There were 210 males and 228 females, giving a sex ratio of 0.92 males per female, with 105 people (24.0%) aged under 15 years, 63 (14.4%) aged 15 to 29, 213 (48.6%) aged 30 to 64, and 57 (13.0%) aged 65 or older.

Ethnicities were 93.8% European/Pākehā, 9.6% Māori, 0.7% Pacific peoples, and 1.4% Asian (totals add to more than 100% since people could identify with multiple ethnicities).

Although some people objected to giving their religion, 65.1% had no religion, 23.3% were Christian and 2.7% had other religions.

Of those at least 15 years old, 33 (9.9%) people had a bachelor or higher degree, and 63 (18.9%) people had no formal qualifications. The employment status of those at least 15 was that 207 (62.2%) people were employed full-time, 45 (13.5%) were part-time, and 9 (2.7%) were unemployed.

Bankside

Bankside had a population of 1,656 at the 2018 New Zealand census, an increase of 51 people (3.2%) since the 2013 census, and an increase of 291 people (21.3%) since the 2006 census. There were 627 households. There were 873 males and 783 females, giving a sex ratio of 1.11 males per female. The median age was 32.9 years (compared with 37.4 years nationally), with 375 people (22.6%) aged under 15 years, 342 (20.7%) aged 15 to 29, 798 (48.2%) aged 30 to 64, and 144 (8.7%) aged 65 or older.

Ethnicities were 82.4% European/Pākehā, 6.3% Māori, 1.3% Pacific peoples, 11.8% Asian, and 3.8% other ethnicities (totals add to more than 100% since people could identify with multiple ethnicities).

The proportion of people born overseas was 24.8%, compared with 27.1% nationally.

Although some people objected to giving their religion, 53.6% had no religion, 33.0% were Christian, 0.9% were Hindu, 0.9% were Buddhist and 3.6% had other religions.

Of those at least 15 years old, 216 (16.9%) people had a bachelor or higher degree, and 216 (16.9%) people had no formal qualifications. The median income was $45,100, compared with $31,800 nationally. The employment status of those at least 15 was that 822 (64.2%) people were employed full-time, 180 (14.1%) were part-time, and 27 (2.1%) were unemployed.

Education
Dunsandel School is a contributing primary school catering for years 1 to 6. Selwyn and Upper Selwyn schools merged into Dunsandel School in 1936.

References

Selwyn District
Populated places in Canterbury, New Zealand